Szymanowice Małe is a village in Otwock County, Gmina Sobienie-Jeziory. The population is near 150.

From 1975 to 1998 this village was in Siedlce Voivodeship.

Villages in Otwock County